Eivind  is a Norwegian masculine given name of Norse origin, Auja-winduR. It is made up of two parts: Auja meaning "lucky/gift", and winduR meaning "winner and/or warrior".  

The name Eivind is also used in Denmark and Sweden, and as Eyvindur in Iceland, though appearing less frequently than in Norway. 

Variations of the name include Eyvind, Øivind, Øyvind and Even.

People with the name
Eivind Aadland, Norwegian conductor
Eivind Aarset, Norwegian guitarist
Eivind Eckbo (1927–2017), Norwegian politician and lawyer
Eivind Groven, Norwegian composer
Eivind Gullberg Jensen, Norwegian conductor
Eivind Reiten, Norwegian economist and former politician

See also
Eoghan

Norwegian masculine given names